Mie Østergaard Nielsen (born 25 September 1996) is a Danish former competitive swimmer who holds the Danish record in several backstroke events.

Career
Nielsen won her first international senior medals at the 2011 European Short Course Swimming Championships, where she won four medals and was named newcomer of the championship.

She made her Olympics debut at the 2012 games where she was taking part in the 100 and 200 m backstroke and the 4×100 m relays in freestyle and medley.

Nielsen missed the 2013 World Aquatics Championships with a knee injury, but won the bronze medal in the 100 m backstroke at the 2015 World Aquatics Championships in Kazan, Russia.

At the 2016 European Aquatics Championships in London, she successfully defended her title in the 100 m backstroke, breaking the Championships record and national record with a time of 58.73.

At the 2016 Summer Olympics in Rio de Janeiro, she won a bronze medal as a part of the 4 × 100 m medley relay alongside Rikke Møller Pedersen, Jeanette Ottesen and Pernille Blume. Here they also broke the European record with a time of 3:55.01.

In October 2020 Nielsen announced her retirement from competitive swimming, citing continued shoulder problems and the uncertainty regarding the proponed 2020 Summer Olympics.

Personal life
She is the daughter of Benny Nielsen, who won silver in the 200 m butterfly at the 1988 Summer Olympics and Lone Jensen, who participated in the 1978 World Aquatics Championships.

References

External links

1996 births
Living people
Olympic swimmers of Denmark
Swimmers at the 2012 Summer Olympics
Swimmers at the 2016 Summer Olympics
Medalists at the FINA World Swimming Championships (25 m)
World Aquatics Championships medalists in swimming
World record holders in swimming
Sportspeople from Aalborg
Danish female backstroke swimmers
Danish female freestyle swimmers
Olympic bronze medalists for Denmark
Medalists at the 2016 Summer Olympics
Olympic bronze medalists in swimming
European Aquatics Championships medalists in swimming